{{DISPLAYTITLE:Xi1 Canis Majoris}}

Xi1 Canis Majoris, Latinized from ξ1 Canis Majoris, is a Beta Cephei variable star in the constellation Canis Major.  It is approximately 1,400 light years from Earth.

ξ1 Canis Majoris is a blue-white B-type star.  It has generally been assigned a luminosity class of III (giant) or IV (subgiant), for example B1III or B0.5IV.  Comparison of its properties with model evolutionary tracks suggest that it is a main sequence star about three quarters of the way through its main sequence lifetime.

The apparent magnitude varies from +4.33 to +4.36 with a period of 5.03 hours. Its pulsations cause its radius to vary by 1.0% to 1.5%.

ξ1 Canis Majoris has the longest known rotation period of any B class star, taking around 30 years to complete one revolution on its axis.  This is thought to be due to magnetic braking; ξ1 Canis Majoris has the strongest magnetic field of any β Cephei star and would be expected to spin down completely in around four million years.  It also has the strongest and hardest X-ray emission of any β Cephei star.

ξ1 Canis Majoris forms a naked eye pairing with ξ2 Canis Majoris a little less than a degree away. In addition, an unseen close companion is suspected due to some faint emission lines in the spectrum that are best explained by a Be star invisible against the brighter primary.

References

Canis Majoris, Xi1
Beta Cephei variables
B-type giants
Canis Major
2387
046328
031125
Durchmusterung objects
Double stars
Canis Majoris, 04